Jeremy Inman is an American voice actor and ADR director, known for his work in anime dubs for Funimation. He is known for his role as Android 16 in Dragon Ball Z and Dragon Ball Z Kai and Akitaru Obi in Fire Force.

Voice acting

Anime series

Film and specials

Video games

Live action
 Shin Godzilla – Izumi

ADR staff credits

ADR directing

References

External links
 

American male voice actors
Living people
American television writers
American male screenwriters
Place of birth missing (living people)
Year of birth missing (living people)
American male television writers
American voice directors